Ángelo Giovanni Araos Llanos (born 6 January 1997) is a Chilean professional footballer who plays as an attacking midfielder for Liga MX club Necaxa.

Club career

Corinthians
On July 31, 2018, Corinthians signed a one-year loan agreement with Araos with an automatic purchase clause of US$4 million at the end of the loan.

Ponte Preta (loan)
On 2 October 2019 Ponte Preta signed Araos on loan until the end of 2019 season.

International career
Araos made an appearance for Chile at under-20 level in the 2017 South American Championship. At under-23 level, Araos represented Chile in both the 2019 Toulon Tournament and the 2020 Pre-Olympic Tournament, in addition to a friendly match versus Brazil U23 on 9 September 2019.

At senior level, he made his debut in a friendly match versus Poland on 8 June 2018.

Career statistics

Club

International

Honours
Corinthians
Campeonato Paulista: 2019

References

External links

1997 births
Living people
People from Antofagasta
Chilean footballers
Chile international footballers
Chile under-20 international footballers
Chilean expatriate footballers
C.D. Antofagasta footballers
Universidad de Chile footballers
Chilean Primera División players
Sport Club Corinthians Paulista players
Associação Atlética Ponte Preta players
Campeonato Brasileiro Série A players
Campeonato Brasileiro Série B players
Club Necaxa footballers
Liga MX players
Association football midfielders
Chilean expatriate sportspeople in Brazil
Chilean expatriate sportspeople in Mexico
Expatriate footballers in Brazil
Expatriate footballers in Mexico